The 1974 All-Big Eight Conference football team consists of American football players chosen by various organizations for All-Big Eight Conference teams for the 1974 NCAA Division I football season.  The selectors for the 1974 season included the Associated Press (AP).

Offensive selections

Ends
 Tinker Owens, Oklahoma (AP)
 Mark Miller, Missouri (AP)

Offensive tackles
 Jerry Arnold, Oklahoma (AP)
 Marvin Crenshaw, Nebraska (AP)

Offensive guards
 John Roush, Oklahoma (AP)
 Tom Wolf, Oklahoma State (AP)

Centers
 Rik Bonness, Nebraska (AP)

Quarterbacks
 David Humm, Nebraska (AP)

Backs
 Joe Washington, Oklahoma (AP)
 Laverne Smith, Kansas (AP)
 Tony Galbreath, Missouri (AP)

Defensive selections

Defensive ends
 Bob Martin, Nebraska (AP)
 Jimbo Elrod, Oklahoma (AP)

Defensive tackles
 Lee Roy Selmon, Oklahoma (AP)
 Phillip Dokes, Oklahoma State (AP)

Middle guards
 Dewey Selmon, Oklahoma (AP)

Linebackers
 Rod Shoate, Oklahoma (AP)
 Tom Ruud, Nebraska (AP)
 Steve Towle, Kansas (AP)

Defensive backs
 Barry Hill, Iowa State (AP)
 Randy Hughes, Oklahoma (AP)
 Kurt Knoff, Kansas (AP)

Key

AP = Associated Press

See also
 1974 College Football All-America Team

References

All-Big Seven Conference football team
All-Big Eight Conference football teams